The balance lever coupling, also known as rocking lever coupling or compensating coupling, is a type of central buffer coupling that has found widespread use, especially in narrow-gauge railways . In Switzerland this type of coupling is called a central buffer with two screw couplings, abbreviated to Zp2, or referred to as a central buffer coupling with coupling hooks on the side

Description 

The UIC standard coupling is not suitable for narrow-gauge railways with their often tight curve radii. By interchanging the pulling and pushing devices, the central buffer coupling with lateral coupling hooks or the balancing lever coupling was created from the standard screw coupling common on standard-gauge railways.

With the balancing lever coupling, a movable balancing lever is mounted transversely behind the buffer, on which a drawhook is attached on the left side and the coupling chain with turnbuckle on the other . If two vehicles with this coupling are facing each other, the chain on the balancing lever is hooked into the hook of the other coupling during the coupling process. This balancing lever can be attached in front of or behind the buffer carrier, in the latter case the hook and eye are passed through recesses in the buffer carrier. When fastening in front of the carrier, the tensile forces are also cushioned via the conical spring of the buffer; when fastening behind the carrier, the balancing lever is connected to the carrier via a second spring.

In the case of simple designs, the turnbuckle is partly replaced by a triangular isosceles chain link. This chain link has side lengths of different lengths, so the length of the coupling chain for separating or tensioning the train can be varied by simply turning the chain link. Instead of the coupling chain with turnbuckle, a screw coupling is also used in newer designs .

With the introduction of rolling vehicle traffic, the balancing lever coupling was combined with the funnel coupling on most of the narrow-gauge railways in order to be able to couple the rolling carriage by means of a dome boom. An additional auxiliary coupling for coupling the trolleys is common on Polish narrow-gauge railways. On the Rhaetian Railway, the roller bogies (roller carriages) are equipped with normal couplings; if necessary, flat wagons can be lined up as barrier vehicles in between.

Gallery

Diagramme of coupling types in Switzerland 
In Switzerland, the center buffer couplings are only referred to as manually operated couplings, but not as automatic couplings. Two types are used.

Usage  
Examples of the use of the balance lever coupling today are:

In Switzerland 
 Matterhorn Gotthard Bahn (MGB)  
 Rhaetian Railway (RhB)
 Yverdon–Ste-Croix railway
 Le Locle–Les Brenets line
 Regional Bus and Rail Company of Ticino] (FART) older vehicles

Outside Switzerland 
 Harz Narrow Gauge Railways (HSB)
 Rügen narrow-gauge railway (RüKB)
 Diakopto–Kalavryta railway - Kalavryta (SPAP-ΣΠΑΠ)

See also 
 Center-buffer-and-chains

References

External links 
 Wiki commons

Couplers